Elmer "Willie" Carter (April 12, 1911 – April 15, 2011), also listed as William Carter, was a Negro league baseball player in the 1930s.

Born in Dalton, Missouri, he was one of seven children.

He played for the Kansas City Monarchs of the Negro National League for two seasons, then joined the Birmingham Black Barons, with whom he played from 1930 to 1932 and again in 1937. He also played for the Little Rock Grays in 1932 and the St. Louis Stars in 1937. Carter served in the US Army's 1st Infantry Division during World War II, seeing service in North Africa and Normandy, and died in Rancho Cordova, California in 2011 at age 100.

References

External links
 and Seamheads

1911 births
2011 deaths
Baseball players from Missouri
African-American centenarians
Men centenarians
Kansas City Monarchs players
Birmingham Black Barons players
St. Louis Stars (1937) players
Little Rock Grays players
African Americans in World War II
United States Army personnel of World War II
Baseball infielders
21st-century African-American people
African-American United States Army personnel